Coffee Johnny aka Coffy Johnny and John Oliver (1829 – 7 April 1900) was immortalised in the 6th verse George Ridley's song 'The Blaydon Races'. Coffee Johnny was a blacksmith in the village of Winlaton,  a trumpeter in the Winlaton Brass Band, a bare-knuckle boxer and Geordie celebrity.
He was well known for his tall height and for wearing a white top hat. This can be seen in photographs and in William Irving's painting 'Blaydon Races'.

Origins of the name
Although George Ridley's original manuscript gives the spelling "Coffy" all later publications spell it in the usual way. Local history archives contain anecdotal evidence that he was nicknamed Coffy because he always used to have a cup before school. There is also anecdotal evidence that he may have been of mixed race, hence his "coffee" coloured skin, which would have been unusual in Tyneside at this time. Furthermore, it has been suggested that it was derived from his birth mother, Sarah Koeffer's, surname. Sara Koeffer was a German lady staying at Ravensworth Castle, near to Winlaton.

Family

Coffee Johnny was adopted by Thomas and Margery Oliver about 1840.

Coffee Johnny married Elizabeth Greener and they had nine children: Katherine, Mary, Elizabeth, Margery, Sarah, Margaret, Tom, Joseph and Hannah. He also had a son, Robert, with Anne Hurst after the death of his wife, who was adopted by Coffee Johnny's daughter Sarah and her husband Miles Batey.

Coffee Johnny is buried in St. Paul's churchyard, Winlaton.

References

Sources
 Wayback Machine
 Sunniside Local History Society
 
 'Under His Hat' by Robert Batey (Eloquent Books 2009)
 St. Pauls, Winlaton, England Parish Records
 'Blaydon Races' by Joan Gale (oriel 1970) 
 'Blaydon Races' pub. Tyne and Wear Archive Service
 'Gateshead Book Of Days' Jo Bath 

English blacksmiths
1829 births
1900 deaths
People from the Metropolitan Borough of Gateshead
Burials in Tyne and Wear
Bare-knuckle boxers